Zamora: tierra y hombres libres is a 2009 film directed by Venezuelan director Román Chalbaud. The film is named after and depicts Ezequiel Zamora, general of the liberals during the Federal War in Venezuela between 1859 and 1863.

Cast

Reception 
Venezuelan film critic Sergio Monsalve said that the movie, along with Chalbaud's late work El Caracazo, Días de poder and La planta insolente, tarnished Chalbaud's career and accomplishments as a filmmaker, saying that they were produced to please the Bolivarian Revolution and the ruling party.

References

External links 
 
 Zamora ¡Tierra y hombres libres! in Film Affinity

2009 films
Venezuelan drama films
Films set in 1859
2000s Spanish-language films
Films directed by Román Chalbaud